Crimson Thunder is the fourth studio album released by the Swedish metal band HammerFall. It was the first album the band worked on with producer Charlie Bauerfeind.

The cover art was created by Samwise Didier, who is also known for his Warcraft concept art pieces.

A music video was made for the song "Hearts on Fire".

Track listing

Release information
 Digipak CD, LP, shaped CD, picture LP, comic book edition, leather bound comic book edition, DVD-audio, value box (with "Hearts on Fire" CDS), Gold Award edition.
 Limited Gold Edition comes in an amaray (DVD-box), including printed HammerFall signatures, golden HammerFall-plectrum, bonus track ("Heeding the Call" – live) and a videoclip ("Hearts on Fire").
Strictly limited Enhanced Gold-Award Edition, issued in DVD case with gold CD and band logo plectrum. CD has all bandmembers' signatures.
Special Comic Edition has a CD of Crimson Thunder housed in an oversize hardback comic book, with an original comic story and the album's original liner notes/lyrics. Strictly Limited CD & Comicbook with 25 pages comic + 7 pages booklet, hardcover size A4 and the bonus track "Rising Force". 
DVD-Audio comes in 5.1 Dolby Surround Multichannel Sound. Playable into all DVD Players and with 5.1 Channel Surround Sound System and has "Hearts on Fire" videoclip. 
There has also been a numbered (1000 have been made) limited edition 3 CD longform leather digibook, that contains two 3-inch mini-CDs with one track on each: "Crazy Nights" (Loudness cover) and "Detroit Rock City" (Kiss cover).

Chart ranking

Personnel
 Joacim Cans – lead vocals
 Oscar Dronjak – guitars, backing vocals
 Stefan Elmgren – guitars, acoustic guitar, backing vocals
 Magnus Rosén – bass
 Anders Johansson – drums

References

External links
 Official HammerFall website
 Album information
 Lyrics at Darklyrics

2002 albums
HammerFall albums
Nuclear Blast albums
Albums produced by Charlie Bauerfeind